The 2015–16 Montenegrin Second League was the tenth season since the establishment of the Montenegrin Second League. The season ran from 15 August 2015 to 29 May 2016.

Format of competition
A total of 12 teams participate in this edition of the Second League. New members are FK Berane and FK Mogren who were relegated from 2014–15 Montenegrin First League, and winners of Montenegrin Third League playoffs - FK Brskovo and FK Grafičar Podgorica.

Teams

The following 12 clubs competed in this season.

League table

Results
The schedule consists of three rounds. During the first two rounds, each team played each other once home-and-away for a total of 22 games. The pairings of the third round were then set according to the standings after the first two rounds, giving every team a third game against each opponent for a total of 33 games per team.

First and second round

Third round

Promotion play-offs
The 3rd-placed team (against the 10th-placed team of the First League) and the runners-up (against the 11th-placed team of the First League) will both compete in two-legged promotion play-offs after the end of the season.

Summary

Matches

Iskra won 8–2 on aggregate.

Petrovac won 1–0 on aggregate.

Top scorers

References

2015-16
2015–16 in Montenegrin football
Montenegro